Luis Pidal may refer to

Luis Menéndez Pidal (1861–1915), Spanish artist
, a Belgian cargo ship in service 1918-25